Časlav Grubić (born 20 June 1952) is a Serbian former handball player.

Club career
After starting out at Železničar Niš, Grubić played for Partizan in the 1972–73 season, as the club suffered relegation from the top flight. He would later play for Železničar Niš on two more occasions, winning three national cups. In the 1977–78 season, Grubić helped the club reach the EHF Cup Winners' Cup final, losing to VfL Gummersbach.

In 1983, Grubić went abroad for the first time and spent one year with Spanish club Tecnisa Alicante. He later returned to Spain and played for Elgorriaga Bidasoa, helping them win the championship title in the 1986–87 season.

International career
At international level, Grubić represented Yugoslavia in three World Championships, winning the gold medal in 1986.

Honours
Železničar Niš
 Yugoslav Handball Cup: 1976–77, 1981–82, 1984–85
Elgorriaga Bidasoa
 Liga ASOBAL: 1986–87

References

1952 births
Living people
Sportspeople from Niš
Serbian male handball players
Yugoslav male handball players
RK Partizan players
Liga ASOBAL players
Expatriate handball players
Yugoslav expatriate sportspeople in Spain